Indian Hills High School may refer to:

Indian Hills High School (Calabasas, California)
Indian Hills High School (New Jersey)